Yaozhou District, formerly Yao County, is a district of the city of Tongchuan, Shaanxi province of the People's Republic of China.

In medieval China, Yaozhou was the site of the Yaozhou kilns.

Administrative divisions

Yaozhou District administers two subdistricts, eleven towns and two townships. The subdistricts are Yong'an and Tianbao. The towns are Liulin, Sigou, Miaowan, Dongjiahe, Yaoqu, Sunyuan, Guanzhuang, Potou, Zhaojin, and Xiaoqiu. The townships are Shizhu and Yanchi.

Climate

References

External links
Introduction to Yaozhou District 

Districts of Shaanxi
Tongchuan